Ochil and South Perthshire is a county constituency of the House of Commons of the Parliament of the United Kingdom. It elects one Member of Parliament (MP) by the first-past-the-post system of election.

The constituency was created for the 2005 general election as a result of the Fifth Review of the Boundary Commission for Scotland. It has been represented since 2019 by John Nicolson of the Scottish National Party (SNP).

Boundaries 

The constituency is composed of the Clackmannanshire council area (all five wards), and the Perth and Kinross council wards of Strathtay, Strathearn, Strathallan, Almond and Earn, and Kinross-shire.

The constituency was created to cover Clackmannanshire and a southern portion of Perth and Kinross; the Perth and North Perthshire constituency was created at the same time to cover the rest of the Perth and Kinross council area.

Prior to the 2005 election, the council areas had been covered by the Angus, Ochil, Perth and North Tayside constituencies. The Perth constituency was entirely within the Perth and Kinross council area, the North Tayside constituency covered a northern portion of Perth and Kinross and a northern portion of the Angus council area, the Angus constituency covered a small southeastern portion of Perth and Kinross, a southern portion of Angus and northern portions of the Dundee City council area, and the Ochil constituency covered another southeastern portion of the Perth and Kinross, the whole of Clackmannanshire and a southeastern portion of the Stirling council area.

Constituency profile and voting patterns

Constituency profile 
The Ochil and South Perthshire constituency covers the rural south of the Perth and Kinross council area south of the River Tay, running down through the Ochil Hills into the more industrial Clackmannanshire council area to the south. It is an affluent constituency.
Agriculture and tourism form an important part of the local economy in the north of the constituency in southern Perth and Kinross-shire, housing affluent resort towns such as Auchterarder, Crieff and Kinross. Clackmannanshire is better known for its light industry and breweries dotted along the course of the River Forth and its northern tributary streams.

Voting patterns 
The Ochil and South Perthshire constituency was formed from elements of the old Ochil and Perth constituencies. Perth was traditionally a strong area of support for the Conservative Party until the party's wipeout in Scotland at the 1997 general election, from then onwards; the area usually voted SNP. Ochil covered the counties of Kinross-shire and Clackmannanshire, alongside some of the more industrialised parts of Stirlingshire, traditionally an SNP-Labour marginal. When Ochil and South Perthshire was first formed, it was thought of as an SNP-Labour marginal; however, the SNP failed to win the constituency when it was created in 2005, and at the subsequent general election in 2010. Tasmina Ahmed-Sheikh gained the seat from Gordon Banks of the Labour Party in a landslide victory across Scotland at the 2015 general election as they won 56 of Scotland's 59 parliamentary seats. At the 2017 general election, Ahmed-Sheikh lost the constituency to Luke Graham of the Conservative Party, and in 2019, Graham lost the seat to John Nicolson, former SNP MP for East Dunbartonshire.

At the 2017 local election all wards in southern Perth and Kinross-shire voted Conservative by a good margin. The result in Clackmannanshire was mixed, with the SNP forming the largest party across the county as a whole but missing out to the Conservatives in Dollar to the north-east of the council area and missing out to Labour in northern Alloa. The Conservatives came first across Ochil and South Perthshire on the whole, with the SNP in second place.

Members of Parliament

Elections

Elections in the 2010s

Elections in the 2000s

References 

Westminster Parliamentary constituencies in Scotland
Constituencies of the Parliament of the United Kingdom established in 2005
Politics of Clackmannanshire
Politics of Perth and Kinross